The Pat Metheny Group was an American jazz band founded in 1977. The core members of the group were guitarist, composer and bandleader Pat Metheny; and keyboardist and composer Lyle Mays, who was in the group at its inception. Other long-standing members included bassist and producer Steve Rodby, from 1981 to 2010, and drummer Antonio Sanchez, from 2002 to 2010. Vocalist Pedro Aznar and drummer Paul Wertico were also long-time members. In addition to a core quartet, the group was often joined by a variety of other instrumentalists expanding the size to six or eight musicians.

History

1970s
Founder Pat Metheny first emerged on the jazz scene in the mid-1970s with a pair of solo albums. First was Bright Size Life, released in 1976, a trio album with bass guitarist Jaco Pastorius and drummer Bob Moses. The next album, released in 1977, was Watercolors, featuring Eberhard Weber on bass, pianist Lyle Mays, and drummer Danny Gottlieb.

In 1977, bassist Mark Egan joined Metheny, Mays, and Gottlieb to form the Pat Metheny Group. ECM released the album Pat Metheny Group in 1978 with songs co-written by Metheny and Mays. Pat Metheny Group marked Mays' first use of the Oberheim synthesizer, which became an integral part of the Group's sound. The group's second album, American Garage in 1979 reached No. 1 on the jazz chart at Billboard magazine.

1980s

The Pat Metheny Group released the album Offramp in 1982. Offramp marked the first recorded appearance of bassist Steve Rodby in the group (replacing Mark Egan), and also featured Brazilian "guest artist" Naná Vasconcelos. Vasconcelos had appeared on the Pat Metheny/Lyle Mays album As Falls Wichita, So Falls Wichita Falls in 1981, and his performance on percussion and wordless vocals marked the first addition of Latin-South American music shadings to the Group's sound. Offramp was also the group's first recording to win a Grammy Award, the first win of many for the group.

In 1983, a live album titled Travels was released. It won the Grammy Award for Best Jazz Fusion Performance in 1984. 1984 brought the release of First Circle, a popular album that featured compositions with mixed meters. With this album, the group had a new drummer, Paul Wertico (replacing Danny Gottlieb). Wertico and Steve Rodby having both played with the Simon & Bard Group. A soundtrack album The Falcon and the Snowman followed in 1985. It featured the song "This Is Not America", a writing and performing collaboration with David Bowie which reached #14 in the UK Top 40 and #32 on the US Billboard Hot 100 in early 1985.

The South American influence would continue and intensify on First Circle with the addition of Argentine multi-instrumentalist Pedro Aznar. This period saw the commercial popularity of the band increase, especially thanks to the live recording Travels. First Circle would also be Metheny's last project with the ECM label; Metheny had been a key artist for ECM but left over conceptual disagreements with label founder Manfred Eicher.

The next three Pat Metheny Group releases would be based around a further intensification of the Brazilian rhythms first heard in the early '80s. Additional South American musicians appear as guests, notably Brazilian percussion player Armando Marçal. Still Life (Talking) in 1987, was the Group's first release on new label, Geffen Records, and featured several tracks which have long been popular with the group's followers, and which are still in their setlist. In particular, the album's first tune, "Minuano (Six Eight)", represents a good example of the Pat Metheny group compositional style from this period: the track starts with a haunting minor section from Mays, lifts off in a typical Methenian jubilant major melody, leading to a Maysian metric and harmonically-modulated interlude, creating suspense which is finally resolved in the Methenian major theme. Another popular highlight was "Last Train Home", a rhythmically relentless piece evoking the American Midwest. The 1989 release Letter from Home continued this approach, with the South American influence becoming even more prevalent in its bossa nova and samba rhythms.

1990s

Metheny then again concentrated on other solo and band projects, and four years went by before the release of the next record for the next Pat Metheny Group. This was a live set recorded in Europe entitled The Road to You in 1993, and it featured tracks from the two Geffen studio albums alongside new tunes. By this stage, the group had integrated new instrumentation and technologies into its sound, including Mays' addition of midi-controlled synthesized sounds to acoustic piano solos, accomplished via a pedal control.

Mays and Metheny refer to the following three Pat Metheny Group releases as the triptych: We Live Here in 1995, Quartet in 1996, and Imaginary Day in 1997. Moving away from the Latin style which had dominated the releases of the previous decade, these albums included hip-hop drum loops, free-form improvisation on acoustic instruments, and symphonic signatures, blues and sonata schemes. On some tunes from this era, the band also experimented with thrash metal, electronica, and folk music from parts of the world unexplored by the band in the past.

2000s
After another hiatus, the Pat Metheny Group re-emerged in 2002 with the release Speaking of Now, marking another change in direction through the addition of younger musicians. Joining the core players (Metheny, Mays and Rodby), were drummer Antonio Sanchez from Mexico City, Vietnam-born trumpeter Cuong Vu from Seattle and bassist, vocalist, guitarist, and percussionist Richard Bona from Cameroon.

Following the group's 2002 tour, Bona left to concentrate on his solo career, but appeared as one of two guest artists (the other being mallet cymbalist Dave Samuels) on the group's final release, 2005's The Way Up, together with a new group member: Swiss-American harmonica player Grégoire Maret. The Way Up is a large-scale concept record which consists of a single 68 minute-long piece (split into four sections only for CD navigation). Metheny has said  that one of the inspirations for the labyrinthine piece was a reaction against a perceived trend for music requiring a short attention span and which lacks nuance and detail. Many of the textures in The Way Up are created from interlocking guitar lines -- Steve Reich is credited on the CD as an inspiration, along with Eberhard Weber, and there are large open sections for solo improvisation and group interplay. On the group's 2005 tour (when its lineup was supplemented by Brazilian multi-instrumentalist Nando Lauria), The Way Up was played in its entirety as the first half of the concert. The final performance of the piece was at a free show for more than a hundred thousand people at the close of the 2005 Montreal Jazz Festival.

Their final album, The Way Up was released through Nonesuch Records. It is planned that all of Metheny's Geffen and Warner Bros. Records albums are to be rereleased on the label. 

The Pat Metheny Group played at the Blue Note Tokyo in January 2009 in its core quartet of Lyle Mays, Steve Rodby and Antonio Sanchez. This quartet version of the group later toured the jazz festivals of Europe in the summer of 2010 as part of the "Songbook Tour". These concerts featured music from all eras of the group but no new material.

Members

Past members
Lyle Mays – piano, synthesizers (1977–2010, died 2020)
Pat Metheny – acoustic and electric guitars, guitar synthesizers (1977–2010)
Mark Egan – bass (1977–1980)
Danny Gottlieb – drums (1977–1982)
Steve Rodby – bass guitar, acoustic bass (1981–2010)
Naná Vasconcelos – vocals, percussion (1980–1982, 1986, died 2016)
Pedro Aznar – vocals, percussion, melodica, guitars, saxophone, miscellaneous instruments (1983–1985, 1989–1991, 1992)
Paul Wertico – drums (1983–2001)
Armando Marçal – percussion, vocals (1987–1992, 1995–1996)
David Blamires – vocals, miscellaneous instruments (1986–1988, 1992, 1994–1997)
Mark Ledford – vocals, miscellaneous instruments (1987–1988, 1992, 1994–1998, died 2004)
Luis Conte - percussion (1994-1995)
Nando Lauria – guitar, vocals, percussion and miscellaneous instruments (1988, 2005)
Philip Hamilton – vocals, miscellaneous instruments (1997–1998)
Jeff Haynes – percussion (1997–1998),
Antonio Sánchez, – drums, percussion (2001–2010)
Richard Bona – percussion, vocals, electric bass, acoustic guitar, miscellaneous instruments (2002–2004)
Cuong Vu – trumpet, vocals, guitar, miscellaneous instruments (2001–2005)
Grégoire Maret – harmonica, vocals, miscellaneous instruments (2003-2005)

Timeline 

* This timeline reflects active members of the band, at either times they recorded or times they toured with the band. Members may have left the band by the time albums they performed on were released. Minor contributors to albums who did not tour with the band are not included.

Discography

Studio albums

Live albums

Compilation albums

Soundtracks

Awards and nominations

References

External links

Pat Metheny home page
Pat Metheny Songbooks
Booking
Band member biographies
 

American jazz ensembles from Missouri
Jazz fusion ensembles
Grammy Award winners
ECM Records artists
Geffen Records artists
Warner Records artists
Nonesuch Records artists
Musical groups established in 1977